Huntingdonshire County Cricket Club, in its current form, was formed in 1948, and has never competed in the Minor Counties Championship.  They have appeared in seven List A matches, making three NatWest Trophy and four Cheltenham & Gloucester Trophy appearances.  The players in this list have all played at least one List A match.  Huntingdonshire cricketers who have not represented the county in List A cricket are excluded from the list.

Players are listed in order of appearance, where players made their debut in the same match, they are ordered by batting order.  Players in bold have played first-class cricket.

Key

List of players

List A captains

References

Huntingdonshire County Cricket Club

Huntingdonshire
Cricketers
Wicket-keepers